Najbolje priče is the third live album by the Serbian punk rock band Goblini released in 2004 by Multimedia Records. The album, featuring live recordings made at the band's peak, also features a bonus studio track "Pričaš", recorded in 1997. On the CD also appeared two music videos, for "Pričaš" and "Voz". Beside Serbia, the album was distributed in Slovenia and Croatia.

Track listing

Personnel 
 Vlada Kokotović — bass
 Zoran Jević "Fric" — drums
 Alen Jovanović — guitar
 Branko Golubović "Golub" — vocals
 Saša Šetka — guitar
 Leo Fon Punkerstain — guitar
 Milan Arnautović "Firca" — drums

References 
 Najbolje priče at Rateyourmusic
 Najbolje priče at Multimedia records official site
 EX YU ROCK enciklopedija 1960-2006, Janjatović Petar; 

2004 live albums
Goblini albums